Ekaterina Nekrassova (born June 21, 1981) is an Estonian retired pair skater. With partner Valdis Mintals, she is a multiple Estonian national champion. They competed many times at the World Figure Skating Championships, the European Figure Skating Championships, and the World Junior Figure Skating Championships. That partnership ended in 1998.

Nekrassova works as a coach. Her former students include Maria Sergejeva / Ilja Glebov.

On January 7, 2021, the Russian Orthodox Christmas, Nekrassova set a world record by swimming under the ice of frozen Siberian Lake Baikal.

Results 
(with Mintals)

References 

 Skatabase: 1990s World Junior Championships
 Skatabase: 1990s European Championships
 Skatabase: 1990s World Championships

External links

Estonian female pair skaters
Figure skating coaches
Living people
1981 births